Philip G. Nord is an American historian specializing in the political and cultural history of modern France. He is the Rosengarten Professor of Modern and Contemporary History (Emeritus) at Princeton University. He is a 2005 recipient of the Guggenheim Fellowship.

Biography 
Nord graduated from Columbia University in 1971 and studied at Balliol College, Oxford on a Kellett Fellowship to study politics, receiving a B.Phil. in 1973. He began teaching at Princeton University in 1981 and received his Ph.D. from Columbia in 1982.

He received a Guggenheim Fellowship in 2005 to finish research on a book examining the remaking of the French state at the Liberation, which was published in 2010 under the title France’s New Deal: From the Thirties to the Postwar Era.

Nord has held visiting professorships at Sciences Po, Paris 1 Panthéon-Sorbonne University, Paris Nanterre University, School for Advanced Studies in the Social Sciences, Martin Luther University of Halle-Wittenberg, and European University Institute.

References 

Living people
Year of birth missing (living people)
Columbia College (New York) alumni

Alumni of Balliol College, Oxford
Princeton University faculty
Columbia Graduate School of Arts and Sciences alumni
20th-century American historians
21st-century American historians